Joyce Muskat was one of only four writers with no prior television credits able to sell a script to Star Trek: The Original Series (David Gerrold, Judy Burns, and Jean Lisette Aroeste were the other three). Star Trek co-producer Robert H. Justman read her unsolicited script, "The Answerer", and recommended it be bought. It was produced as Episode 63, "The Empath" during the third and final season, and was her only sale to television.

Joyce Muskat is an active member of California's Society for Creative Anachronism.

References

External links
 

Living people
American television writers
Medieval reenactment
Year of birth missing (living people)